The 2009–10 National League 2 North was the first season (twenty-third overall) of the fourth tier (north) of the English domestic rugby union competitions since the professionalised format of the second division was introduced.  Previously known as National Division 3 North, it had been renamed due to widespread changes to the league system by the RFU with National One becoming the Championship, National 2 becoming National 1 and so on.  The league system was 4 points for a win, 2 points for a draw and additional bonus points being awarded for scoring 4 or more tries and/or losing within 7 points of the victorious team.  In terms of promotion the league champions would go straight up into National League 1 while the runners up would have a one-game playoff against the runners up from National League 2 South (at the home ground of the club with the superior league record) for the final promotion place. A further change to the league system would see the division increase from 14 to 16 teams.

After finishing 3rd the previous season, Macclesfield would go two places better by winning the league title in what was a very close contest with runners up Loughborough Students - Macclesfield clinching the championship by benefit of just 3 points (one more win).  Loughborough Students  would fail to join Macclesfield in the 2010–11 National League 1 as they lost their playoff at home to the 2009–10 National League 2 South runners up Rosslyn Park.   At the other end of the table, Waterloo suffered their 3rd successive relegation as the worst side in the division, followed at later dates by the more competitive Bradford & Bingley and newly promoted Broadstreet.  Waterloo and Bradford & Bingley would drop to National League 3 North while Broadstreet would fall back down to the National League 3 Midlands.

Participating teams and locations

Eleven of the teams listed below participated in the 2008–09 National Division Three North season; Waterloo were relegated from the 2008–09 National Division Two, while Broadstreet would come up as champions of Midlands Division 1 along with Westoe (champions) and Hull (playoffs) from North Division 1.  A further move saw that Rugby Lions were level transferred (again) across from the National League 2 South as the most northerly team in that division after promotion and relegation left the two leagues unbalanced (in the end there would still be an imbalance as Mounts Bay's liquidation meant there would only be 15 teams in the 2009–10 National League 2 South compared to 16 in National League 2 North).

Final league table

Results

Round 1

Round 2

Round 3

Round 4

Round 5

Round 6

Round 7

Round 8

Round 9

Round 10

Round 11

Round 12

Round 13

Round 14

Round 15 

Postponed.  Game rescheduled to 6 February 2010.

Postponed.  Game rescheduled to 6 February 2010.

Postponed.  Game rescheduled to 6 February 2010.

Postponed.  Game rescheduled to 6 February 2010.

Postponed.  Game rescheduled to 6 February 2010.

Postponed.  Game rescheduled to 6 February 2010.

Postponed.  Game rescheduled to 6 February 2010.

Postponed.  Game rescheduled to 6 February 2010.

Round 16 

Postponed.  Game rescheduled to 20 March 2010.

Postponed.  Game rescheduled to 20 March 2010.

Postponed.  Game rescheduled to 20 March 2010.

Postponed.  Game rescheduled to 20 March 2010.

Postponed.  Game rescheduled to 29 April 2010.

Round 17 

Postponed.  Game rescheduled to 1 May 2010.

Postponed.  Game rescheduled to 1 May 2010.

Postponed.  Game rescheduled to 1 May 2010.

Postponed.  Game rescheduled to 1 May 2010.

Postponed.  Game rescheduled to 1 May 2010.

Postponed.  Game rescheduled to 1 May 2010.

Postponed.  Game rescheduled to 1 May 2010.

Postponed.  Game rescheduled to 5 May 2010.

Round 18 

Postponed.  Game rescheduled to 8 May 2010.

Postponed.  Game rescheduled to 8 May 2010.

Postponed.  Game rescheduled to 8 May 2010.

Postponed.  Game rescheduled to 15 May 2010.

Postponed.  Game rescheduled to 8 May 2010.

Round 19

Round 20 

Postponed.  Game rescheduled to 15 May 2010.

Postponed.  Game rescheduled to 8 May 2010.

Round 15 (rescheduled games) 

Game rescheduled from 19 December 2009.

Game rescheduled from 19 December 2009.

Game rescheduled from 19 December 2009.

Game rescheduled from 19 December 2009.

Game rescheduled from 19 December 2009.

Game rescheduled from 19 December 2009.

Game rescheduled from 19 December 2009.

Game rescheduled from 19 December 2009.

Round 21

Round 22 

Postponed.  Game rescheduled for 8 May 2010.

Round 23

Round 24

Round 25

Round 16 (rescheduled games) 

Game rescheduled from 2 January 2010.

Game rescheduled from 2 January 2010.

Game rescheduled from 2 January 2010.

Game rescheduled from 2 January 2010.

Round 26

Round 27

Round 28

Round 29

Round 30

Round 20 (rescheduled game) 

Game rescheduled from 2 January 2010.

Round 17 (rescheduled games) 

Game rescheduled from 9 January 2010.

Game rescheduled from 9 January 2010.

Game rescheduled from 9 January 2010.

Game rescheduled from 9 January 2010.

Game rescheduled from 9 January 2010.

Game rescheduled from 9 January 2010.

Game rescheduled from 9 January 2010.

Round 17 (rescheduled game) 

Game rescheduled from 9 January 2010.

Rounds 18, 20 & 22 (rescheduled games) 

Game rescheduled from 16 January 2010.

Game rescheduled from 20 February 2010.

Game rescheduled from 16 January 2010.

Game rescheduled from 16 January 2010.

Game rescheduled from 30 January 2010.

Game rescheduled from 16 January 2010.

Rounds 18 & 20 (rescheduled games) 

Game rescheduled from 30 January 2010.  Game would ultimately be cancelled as result would have no outcome on final league table.

Game rescheduled from 16 January 2010.  Game would ultimately be cancelled as result would have no outcome on final league table.

Promotion play-off
Each season, the runners-up in the National League 2 North and National League 2 South participate in a play-off for promotion into National League 1. Loughborough Students were runners-up in the North and would host the game as they had a better record in the league in comparison to the South runners up Rosslyn Park.

Total season attendances 
Figures not including north-south promotion playoff.

Individual statistics 

 Note that points scorers includes tries as well as conversions, penalties and drop goals.

Top points scorers

Top try scorers

Season records

Team
Largest home win — 86 pts
100 - 14  Leicester Lions at home to Kendal on 24 April 2010
Largest away win — 90 pts
104 - 14  Macclesfield away to Waterloo on 30 January 2010
Most points scored — 104 pts
104 - 14  Macclesfield away to Waterloo on 30 January 2010
Most tries in a match — 15 (x2)
Macclesfield away to Waterloo on 30 January 2010
Leicester Lions at home to Kendal on 24 April 2010
Most conversions in a match — 13
Macclesfield away to Waterloo on 30 January 2010
Most penalties in a match — 6
Huddersfield away to Caldy on 12 September 2009
Most drop goals in a match — 2
Kendal away to Huddersfield on 10 April 2010

Player
Most points in a match — 49
 Ross Winney for Macclesfield away to Waterloo on 30 January 2010
Most tries in a match — 4 (x4)
 Greg Summers for Broadstreet away to Hull Ionians on 26 September 2009
 John Williamson for Leicester Lions at home to Westoe on 14 November 2009
 Ross Winney for Macclesfield away to Waterloo on 30 January 2010
 Matthew Clark for Huddersfield at home to Waterloo on 24 April 2010
Most conversions in a match — 13
 Ross Winney for Macclesfield away to Waterloo on 30 January 2010
Most penalties in a match — 6
 Chris Johnson for Huddersfield away to Caldy on 12 September 2009
Most drop goals in a match — 2
 Mike Scott for Kendal away to Huddersfield on 10 April 2010

Attendances
Highest — 735 
Fylde at home to Preston Grasshoppers on 6 February 2010
Lowest — 100 (x11)
Bradford & Bingley at home to Leicester Lions on 3 October 2009
Hull at home to Kendal on 7 November 2009
Loughborough Students at home to Rugby Lions on 2 January 2010
Westoe at home to Hull on 23 January 2010
Leicester Lions at home to Hull on 6 February 2010
Leicester Lions at home to Hull Ionians on 20 February 2010
Loughborough Students at home to Broadstreet on 27 February 2010
Leicester Lions at home to Harrogate on 27 March 2010
Loughborough Students at home to Leicester Lions on 3 April 2010
Leicester Lions at home to Kendal on 24 April 2010
Westoe at home to Loughborough Students on 5 May 2010
Highest Average Attendance — 430
Kendal
Lowest Average Attendance — 136
Leicester Lions

See also
 English Rugby Union Leagues
 English rugby union system
 Rugby union in England

References

External links
 NCA Rugby

2009-10
2009–10 in English rugby union leagues